The Flumendosa is a river of southern Sardinia, Italy.

The Flumendosa's springs are located in the Gennargentu massif, at the foot of the Monte Armidda; it flows into the Tyrrhenian Sea near the towns of Muravera and Villaputzu.

Rivers of Italy
Rivers of Sardinia
Rivers of the Province of South Sardinia
Drainage basins of the Tyrrhenian Sea